Malana is an ancient Indian village in the state of Himachal Pradesh. The only village in the Malana Nala, a side valley of the Parvati Valley northeast of the Kullu Valley, it is isolated from the rest of the world. The peaks of Chanderkhani and Deo Tibba shadow the village. Malana has its own lifestyle and social structure, and people are strict in following their customs. Malana has been the subject of various documentaries, including Malana: Globalization of a Himalayan Village. and Malana, A Lost Identity. The existing speakers of the autochthonous language Kanashi, the traditional language of the inhabitants of Malana, number approximately 1700. According to the 1961 census, the language speakers were then 563, but today the population of Malana is at least three times as large as 40 years ago. The most common route to the village is by taxi or bus from Jhari. Roads to Malana Village trekking gate are developed.

History 
According to local legends, Jamlu rishi (sage) inhabited this place and made rules and regulations. The locals claim it was one of the oldest democracies of the world, with a well-organized parliamentary system, guided by their devta (deity) Jamlu rishi. Although Jamlu is currently identified with a sage from the Puranas, this is a relatively recent development. Jamlu is believed to have been worshipped in pre-Aryan times. Penelope Chetwood recounts a tale about an orthodox Brahmin priest, who visited Malana, and tried to educate the locals about the pedigree of their god, and what subsequently befell the hapless priest.

Malana has been called ‘one of the oldest democracies’ in the world. The villagers believe that they are descendant of Aryan civilization.

A dam project, the Malana Hydro Power Station, has brought Malana much closer to the rest of the world and provides revenue for the region. A new road has shortened the walking time from several days to just 4 hours. The Hydro Malana Project has also ruined the beauty of the valley. On 5 January 2008, a raging fire in the village, which burnt for more than 5 hours,  destroyed cultural structures and parts of ancient temples located in the village. In 2017, the village ordered the closure of approximately a dozen guest houses and restaurants, ostensibly on the orders of the deity Jamlu.

Government
Although the village is situated in Himanchal Pradesh, India, people of this village do not consider them to be a part of India. They have their own judiciary system as well. The village is governed by a bicameral parliament, consisting of lower house called the Kanishthang and an upper house called the Jayeshthang. The current panchayat is Bhagi Ram.

Language
The residents of Malana speak Kanashi/Raksh (supposedly the dialect of people residing there long ago), which is understood only by the villagers.  "Kanashi, the language of Malana, does not resemble any of the dialects spoken in its neighbourhood but seems to be a mixture of Sanskrit and several Tibetan dialects." Ethnologue classifies Malana as a Tibetan-Burmese language, rather than as a member of the Indo-European languages, and notes that Kanashi has no intelligibility with any Tibeto-Burman language of Kinnaur" although Malana is surrounded by Indo-Aryan language speaking populations.

Economy
The economy of Malana was traditionally based on making baskets, ropes and slippers from hemp. Marijuana was cultivated as a legal cash crop for centuries. Beginning in the 1980s, Malana became a destination for recreational drug tourism. The village also produces maize and potatoes. While tourism is now a major source of income for the village, tourist can only stay outside the village in cafes like The Marley Shed, Baba Cafe, Cafe Rudra, and more, but not inside the village or in homestays which was previously allowed.

Culture and lifestyle

The village administration is democratic and is believed, by locals, to be the oldest republic of the world.

Despite being a part of the Kullu valley, there is a myth that the Malanis have very distinct physical features, and a dialect which is different from the rest of the valley. However, in the valleys of Himachal, there are a significant number of distinct Pahadi dialects, some of them totally different from each other. Hence the physical/lingual uniqueness cannot be proven, given the inaccessibility of the Malana people, except for the trade of Marijuana / Hashish in the Parvati valley.

Jamblu Devta

The social structure of Malana in fact rests on villagers' unshaken faith in their powerful deity, Jamblu Devta. The entire administration of the village is controlled by him through a village council. This council has eleven members and they are believed as delegates of Jamblu who govern the village in his name. His decision is ultimate in any dispute and any outsider authority is never required. Thus Malana has been named the Athens of Himalayas.

Jamlu is invoked through a villager serving as an oracle. deity Jamalu known as Rishi Jamdagni.

Hellenic connection

There are various legends about their origin. According to one of them, it is believed that they are the descendants of Greek soldiers of Alexander's army. As the legend goes, some soldiers took refuge in this remote land after Alexander left the country and later settled there permanently. This myth is however disputed because there are those who claim that it is the valley of Kalash, in Pakistan that is actually the area in which Alexander the Great's soldiers took refuge.  This legend is also inconsistent with the legendary descent of the local people from Indo-Aryans who would pre-date Alexander the Great's soldiers by approximately a thousand years.  Recent genetic typing of the Malani population is much more consistent with an Indo-Aryan origin with a large proportion of Y-DNA haplotypes J2 and R1a which are the haplotypes of majority of Indians, North or South in South Asia rather than with a Greek origin which would have a different characteristic mix of Y-DNA haplotypes such as R2b. J2 and R1a are paternal lineages found in more than 20% and 40% of population of North/South India but are rare in Mediterranean societies like Greece.

Temples
The village has several ancient temples. (1) Jamlu temple, built in Kathkuni style, with wooden carving and deer heads  (2) Rukmini temple

Malana Cream
Malana is famous for its “Malana Cream”, a product made from cannabis plants which grow in the Parvati valley. Malana cream is regarded as high purity hash. In order to make Malana Cream the live cannabis flower is rubbed between the hands repeatedly, pulling out the resin to generate a layer of sticky hashish across the palm.

References

Further reading

External links

 Malana : Shangrila in the Himalayas
 Himalayan Culture and Mountaineering Museum

Kullu
Villages in Kullu district